Skor is a chocolate toffee bar produced by The Hershey Company. It was first marketed in the United States in 1981 and in Canada starting in 1983. The Skor bar consists of a thin slab of butter toffee covered in a milk chocolate coating.  Skor is available as a single- or king size-wrapped candy bar in a 1.4 oz (39 gram) portion.

The Skor bar was originally created to compete with the Heath bar, which was produced by the Heath Company but acquired by the Leaf Candy Company and sold to Hershey in 1996. Hershey now markets both of these competitors.  The Skor bar is very similar to the Heath bar, but with minor differences such as the Skor bar being slightly thinner.

References

Chocolate bars
The Hershey Company brands
Products introduced in 1981
Toffee
Candy